Cuman or Kuman (also called Kipchak, Qypchaq or Polovtsian, self referred to as Tatar (tatar til) in Codex Cumanicus) was a West Kipchak Turkic language spoken by the Cumans (Polovtsy, Folban, Vallany, Kun) and Kipchaks; the language was similar to today's various languages of the West Kipchak branch. Cuman is documented in medieval works, including the Codex Cumanicus, and in early modern manuscripts, like the notebook of Benedictine monk Johannes ex Grafing. It was a literary language in Central and Eastern Europe that left a rich literary inheritance. The language became the main language (lingua franca) of the Golden Horde.

History

The Cumans were nomadic people who lived on the steppes of Eastern Europe, north of the Black Sea, before the Golden Horde. Many Turkic peoples including the Crimean Tatars, Karachays, Kumyks, Crimean Karaites, Krymchaks and Balkars are descended from the Cumans. Today, the speakers of these various languages belonging to the Kipchak branch speak variations closely related to the Cuman language.

The literary Cuman language became extinct in the early 18th century in the region of Cumania in Hungary, which was its last stronghold. Tradition holds that the last speaker of the Cuman language in Hungary was István Varró, a resident of Karcag (Hungary) who died in 1770.  Cuman in Crimea, however, became the ancestor of the central dialect of Crimean Tatar.

The Cuman-Kipchaks had an important role in the history of Kazakhstan, Ukraine, Russia, Georgia, Hungary, Romania (see, for example, the Besarab dynasty), Moldavia, Bessarabia and Bulgaria.

Sample
From the book known as the Codex Cumanicus, a Cuman Kipchak Turkic Pater Noster (transcribed in the Common Turkic Alphabet):

References

Sources
 Güner, Galip  (2013), Kıpçak Türkçesi Grameri, Kesit Press, İstanbul.
 Mustafa Argunşah, Galip Güner (2015), Codex Cumanicus, Kesit Yayınları, İstanbul.

External links
 Texts in Ukrainian Cuman
 Lord's Prayer in Hungarian Cuman
 Kipchak Middle Age literature

Agglutinative languages
Languages extinct in the 18th century
Medieval languages
Cuman language